Bewaldeth and Snittlegarth is a civil parish in the Borough of Allerdale in Cumbria, England.  It contains eight listed buildings that are recorded in the National Heritage List for England.  All the listed buildings are designated at Grade II, the lowest of the three grades, which is applied to "buildings of national importance and special interest".  It contains the settlement of Bewaldeth, and is almost entirely rural.  All the listed buildings are houses and associated structures, farmhouses and farm buildings.


Buildings

References

Citations

Sources

Lists of listed buildings in Cumbria